Mariner Glacier is a major glacier over  long, descending southeast from the plateau of Victoria Land, between Mountaineer Range and Malta Plateau, and terminating at Lady Newnes Bay, Ross Sea, where it forms the floating Mariner Glacier Tongue.   Its lower reaches and entrance to its valley were reconnoitered in December 1958 by Captain John Cadwalader, US Navy, and two members of New Zealand Geological Survey Antarctic Expedition (NZGSAE), in a flight from the icebreakers USS Glacier and USS Staten Island which were lying close off the south end of Coulman Island, in an attempt to land expedition members on the mainland. Named by NZGSAE, 1958–59, as a tribute to the work of mariners in Antarctic research and exploration.

References

Glaciers of Victoria Land
Borchgrevink Coast